The 1971 Men's European Volleyball Championship was the eighth edition of the event, organized by Europe's governing volleyball body, the Confédération Européenne de Volleyball. It was hosted in several cities in Italy from September 23 to October 1, 1971, with the final round held in Milan.

Teams

Group A – Forlì
 (did not compete)

 (did not compete)

Group B – Bergamo

Group C – Ancona

Group D – Milan

Group E – Turin

Group F – Modena

Preliminary round

Final round

Final ranking

References
 Results

1971
European Championship,Men
Volleyball European Championship,Men
European Championship,1971,Men
Sports competitions in Milan
1971,Men's European Volleyball Championship
Volleyball Championship,European,Men
Volleyball Championship,European,Men